Kržeti is a village in the hills southwest of Sodražica in southern Slovenia. The area is part of the traditional region of Lower Carniola. The entire Municipality of Sodražica is included in the Southeast Slovenia Statistical Region. Together with the villages of Betonovo, Kračali, Janeži, and Petrinci it comprises the community and Parish of Gora nad Sodražico, also known as Gora.

Mass graves
Kržeti is the site of two known mass graves associated with the Second World War. It contains the remains of between 120 and 150 members of the Russian Liberation Army that fell during an attack on Ribnica. The Petrinci Commons 2 Mass Grave is located at the edge of the woods next to the first grave. It contains the remains of an undetermined number of civilians.

References

External links
Kržeti on Geopedia

Populated places in the Municipality of Sodražica